Happily Ever After is a fireworks and projection mapping show which debuted at the Magic Kingdom on May 12, 2017. Unlike its predecessor, Wishes: A Magical Gathering of Disney Dreams, the show included projection mapping across Cinderella Castle, lasers, and searchlights, in addition to pyrotechnics. The show included characters and music from a wide array of Disney films. The music also included a theme song adapted from Hong Kong Disneyland's 10th anniversary celebration (and its subsequent show Mickey and the Wondrous Book) and Shanghai Disneyland's Mickey's Storybook Adventure; the song was written by Adam Watts, Melissa Peirce, and Andrew Dodd, and performed by Angie Keilhauer and Jordan Fisher.

The show was promised to feature the most technologically advanced projection mapping display in Disney Parks history (after the introduction from ElecTRONica at Disney California Adventure). The show was temporarily replaced on September 29, 2021, and was succeeded by the new show Disney Enchantment for Walt Disney World's 50th Anniversary on September 30, 2021. On September 11, 2022, it was announced at the D23 Expo that the show will return to Magic Kingdom in an updated form in 2023. On January 10, 2023, Disney announced the show will return to Magic Kingdom beginning April 3, 2023, as part of the Disney 100 Years of Wonder celebration, replacing its successor, Disney Enchantment, which will play its last show the night prior. However, on March 14, 2023, Magic Kingdom announced that the updated version of the show features fireworks, projection mapping, lasers, and searchlights set to Disney music that extend from Cinderella Castle down to Main Street, U.S.A., similar to its predecessor, Disney Enchantment.

Show summary
Opening
"...And they all lived happily ever after.

Each of us has a dream, a heart’s desire. It calls to us. And when we’re brave enough to listen, and bold enough to pursue, that dream will lead us on a journey to discover who we’re meant to be.

All we have to do is look inside our hearts and unlock the magic within..."

A keyhole appears on Cinderella Castle. Magical pixie dust flows through the keyhole and covers the castle and surrounding turrets in royal red and gold as the Happily Ever After theme song plays. Searchlights, lasers (from and towards the castle), and eventually fireworks come into play. 

Dreams
Introduced by Tiana, we see various Disney characters longing for their deepest desires – Ariel wishing to be ‘part of our world’, Remy for his own career as a cook in Paris, Rapunzel for freedom from her tower, and Quasimodo for one day to be ‘out there’ from the tower of Notre Dame.

Songs include: "Down in New Orleans (Prologue)", "Part of Your World" and "Out There".

Journey
Introduced by Merida,  characters from Brave, A Bug's Life, Cars, Up, Finding Nemo, and Moana are shown embarking on their adventures.

Songs include: "Touch the Sky" and "How Far I'll Go".

Friendship
Introduced by Aladdin, this segment highlights the friendships shared by Disney characters from Tarzan, The Lion King, Toy Story, The Jungle Book, Wreck-It Ralph, Big Hero 6, Zootopia, Inside Out, Monsters Inc., and Aladdin. The segment comes full circle with a showstopping performance by the Genie.

Songs featured: "Trashin' the Camp", "Hakuna Matata", "You've Got a Friend in Me", "The Bare Necessities", "I've Got No Strings", "That’s What Friends Are For" and "Friend Like Me".

Love
Introduced by Olaf, a full moon rises across the castle that leads into romances and acts of love shared by characters from WALL-E, Beauty and the Beast, Finding Dory, Lady and the Tramp, and Dumbo. The castle turns into a garden with waterfalls and then transitions to show silhouettes of Disney princes and princesses; floating lanterns from Tangled are seen covering the castle as Rapunzel and Flynn Rider duet and send their own lanterns to the top of the castle.

Songs featured are "Love is an Open Door", "Can You Feel the Love Tonight", "You'll Be in My Heart" and "I See the Light".

Adversity
Introduced by the Emperor of China from Mulan, the show becomes aggressive and loud, highlighting the climactic battles and challenges the characters face including epic scenes from The Incredibles, The Little Mermaid, The Lion King, Aladdin, Sleeping Beauty, and Pirates of the Caribbean. The castle and its surroundings are peppered with explosions as many more climactic scenes are shown. When it is over, the castle is left a flaming ruin with gaping holes in its sides.

Music featured include instrumental selections from Frozen, The Lion King and Pirates of the Caribbean.

Triumph
The visage constellation of Mufasa appears across a starry sky reminding us to “remember who [we] are”. As an inspirational version of "Go the Distance" from Hercules plays, turret by turret, the castle gradually repairs itself while we see the featured characters in their triumphant moments. As the music swells, the structure turns gold with stained-glass portraits of the characters, all of them accomplishing their 'happily ever after'.

Finale
The show ends with the narrator challenging the audience to unlock their own magic and make their dreams come true, just as the characters did. The keyhole reappears and a pixie flies from it, leaving a trail of dust around the central plaza. As the castle restores itself to red and gold, the pixie flies up to the highest spire, where it’s revealed to be Tinker Bell, making her flight over the park to the familiar refrain of "You Can Fly". The castle and illuminated central plaza change color as multi-color peony fireworks appear in the sky. The keyhole then turns and opens, unleashing a colorful final set of fireworks.

See also
 Remember... Dreams Come True
 Disney's Celebrate America
 Disneyland Forever
 Celebrate! Tokyo Disneyland
 Disney Illuminations

References

Amusement park attractions introduced in 2017
Amusement park attractions that closed in 2021
Amusement park attractions introduced in 2023
Walt Disney Parks and Resorts fireworks
Magic Kingdom
2017 establishments in Florida
2021 disestablishments in Florida